Kentucky Route 107 (KY 107) is a  east–west state highway in west–central Kentucky. The western (southern) terminus of the route is an "end of state maintenance" terminus near the Fort Campbell military reservation south of Donaldson Creek near La Fayette, and its northern (eastern) terminus is at an intersection with U.s. Route 431 (US 431) in Lewisburg.

Route description

Christian County
KY 107's southern terminus is located just south of the Christian County community of LaFayette, near an entrance to the Fort Campbell Military Reservation, falling just short of the Tennessee state line. The highway starts its course as LaFayette Road from there until downtown Hopkinsville. The highway's first  go through mainly rural areas of southern Christian County, with intersections at KY 117 at Herndon, and KY 345 at Beverly. At mile marker 10.8, KY 107 crosses over I-24 via an overpass. It enters the city of Hopkinsville after crossing the US 68 Bypass/US 68 Truck Route.

In downtown Hopkinsville, KY 107 joins the eastbound lanes of the actual alignment of US 41/US 68, KY 80, and (within downtown only) KY 109. It follows US 41/US 68 and KY 80/KY 109 until it reaches Campbell Street. KY 107 turns off on Campbell Street, and makes a right turn onto East 7th Street. It then goes over I-169 (the Edward T. Breathitt Pennyrile Parkway), and then makes a turn to the north-northeast at an intersection with KY 507 (Pilot Rock Road).

It leaves town after the junction with KY 1682, the Hopkinsville Bypass. KY 107 then goes through the communities of Fearsville, where it crosses KY 189.

Todd & Logan Counties
After exiting Fearsville, KY 107 enters the northern segment of Todd County near Kirkmansville where it meets KY 171. It then gets co-signed with KY 181 at Clifty. KY 107 after separating from KY 181 is known as Todd-Deer Lick Road, and becomes known simply as Deer Lick Road upon entry into Logan County. The junction with KY 1293 at Deer Lick provides access to Lake Malone. KY 107 ends at Lewisburg, where it intersects with US 431, in the middle of that route's section that is co-signed with KY 106.

Major intersections

See also

References

External links
KY 107 at Kentucky Roads

0107
0107
0107
0107